Vakhtang Khvadagiani (born 4 April 1972) is a retired Georgian footballer.

External links

1972 births
Living people
Soviet footballers
Footballers from Georgia (country)
Expatriate footballers from Georgia (country)
Georgia (country) international footballers
PAS Giannina F.C. players
Expatriate footballers in Greece
Expatriate footballers in Ukraine
Expatriate sportspeople from Georgia (country) in Ukraine
Expatriate sportspeople from Georgia (country) in Greece
NK Veres Rivne players
Ukrainian Premier League players
Footballers from Tbilisi
FC Dinamo Tbilisi players
FC Samtredia players
FC Torpedo Kutaisi players
FC Kolkheti-1913 Poti players
FC Sokol Saratov players
FC Ameri Tbilisi players
Expatriate footballers in Russia
Association football defenders